Zu Audio is an audiophile loudspeaker and cable manufacturer located and established in Ogden, Utah.

References

External links
https://www.stereophile.com/content/zu-audio-soul-supreme-loudspeaker
Zu Audio | Home Theater Review
Zu Audio Essence Loudspeaker (TAS 212)

Audio equipment manufacturers of the United States
Companies based in Utah
Headphones manufacturers
Loudspeaker manufacturers
2000 establishments in Utah